2-Methyl-3,4-methylenedioxyamphetamine (2-methyl-MDA) is an entactogen and psychedelic drug of the amphetamine class. It acts as a selective serotonin releasing agent (SSRA), with IC50 values of 93nM, 12,000nM, and 1,937nM for serotonin, dopamine, and norepinephrine efflux. 2-Methyl-MDA is more potent than MDA and 5-methyl-MDA. However, it is slightly more selective for serotonin over dopamine and norepinephrine release in comparison to 5-methyl-MDA.

References 

Substituted amphetamines
Benzodioxoles
Entactogens and empathogens
Serotonin releasing agents